Bon Jovi is the debut studio album by American rock band Bon Jovi, released on January 23, 1984, by Mercury Records. Produced by Tony Bongiovi and Lance Quinn, it is significant for being the only Bon Jovi album in which a song ("She Don't Know Me") appears that was not written or co-written by a member of the band. The album charted at number 43 on the US Billboard 200.

Aside from the hit single "Runaway", songs from the album were rarely performed live after Bon Jovi released Slippery When Wet in 1986. However, on the band's 2010 Circle Tour, songs including "Roulette", "Shot Through the Heart" and "Get Ready" were performed. The album was ranked the 11th best rock album of 1984 by Kerrang! magazine.

The song "Shot Through the Heart" should not be confused with the much better-known "You Give Love a Bad Name" from Slippery When Wet.

Background
In 1980, Jon Bon Jovi (born John Francis Bongiovi) began work at Power Station Studios, a Manhattan recording facility where his cousin, Tony Bongiovi, was a co-owner. Jon made several demos and sent them out to record companies, but failed to make an impact.

In 1982, Jon went to local radio station WAPP 103.5FM "The Apple". DJ Chip Hobart listened to the demos and loved "Runaway", deciding to include it on the station's compilation album of local homegrown talent. The studio musicians who helped record "Runaway" were known as The All Star Review. They were: guitarist Tim Pierce, keyboardist Roy Bittan, drummer Frankie LaRocka, bass guitarist Hugh McDonald, and additional singers David Grahmme and Mick Seeley (Seeley also composed the distinctive keyboard riff that opens the song). McDonald would later replace Alec John Such as Bon Jovi's bass guitarist.

The song began to get airplay around New York. Jon signed to Mercury Records, part of the PolyGram company. He wanted a band name and the A&R staff at PolyGram came up with Bon Jovi.

In March 1983, Bon Jovi called David Bryan (then known as Rashbaum), who in turn called bass guitarist Alec John Such and an experienced drummer named Tico Torres. At that time Bon Jovi's lead guitarist was Dave Sabo, who later formed the band Skid Row. Sabo was soon replaced by Richie Sambora.

"We weren't a good band", Bon Jovi said in 2007. "We didn't become a good band until the third record, but we had a drummer who could keep time, which you should never take for granted. But I did okay for a 22-year-old. I'd only been in a studio for three years total prior to that record and I didn't know anything about comping a vocal – where you take a word or a line from one track and piece it together. I was thinking, My God, I'm so bad that they have to put my vocals together for me. The engineer was saying, Don't fret, Jon: even Freddie Mercury and the greats have to comp a vocal."

Release and reception

AllMusic has retrospectively rated Bon Jovi three-and-a-half out of five stars. Leslie Mathew, who reviewed the album, said: "The songs may be simple and the writing prone to all clichés of the form, but the album boasts a pretty consistent hard rock attack, passionate playing, and a keen sense of melody", and called the album "an often-overlooked minor gem from the early days of hair metal".

Track listing

Personnel

Bon Jovi
Jon Bon Jovi – lead vocals , guitar
Richie Sambora – guitar, backing vocals
Alec John Such – bass, backing vocals
Tico "The Hitman" Torres – drums
David Rashbaum – keyboards, backing vocals

Additional musicians
Hugh McDonald – bass on "Runaway"
Roy Bittan – keyboards on "Runaway"
Chuck Burgi – additional drums
Doug Katsaros – additional keyboards
Frankie LaRocka – drums on "Runaway"
Aldo Nova – additional guitar and keyboards
Tim Pierce – guitar on "Runaway"
David Grahmme – backing vocals on "Runaway"
Mick Seeley – backing vocals on "Runaway"

Engineers
Larry Alexander
Jeff Hendrickson
John Bengelshmy
Arthur Mann - executive producer

Design
Spencer Drate – album design
Judith Salavetz – album design
Geoffrey Hargrave Thomas – photography

Charts

Weekly charts

Year-end charts

Certifications

References

1984 debut albums
Albums produced by Tony Bongiovi
Bon Jovi albums
Mercury Records albums
Vertigo Records albums